Open for Engagements is the first studio album released by the Quarrymen after their 1994 reformation. The Quarrymen, in its original conception, was the band that evolved into the Beatles. However the only official members of the Quarrymen to appear on the album were founding members Rod Davis and John Duff Lowe.

Background
Former the Quarrymen members Rod Davis and John Duff Lowe recorded an album in 1994 with the use of studio musicians. Open for Engagements was subsequently released under the Quarrymen name.

Track listing

Personnel
Of the lineup, only Rod Davis (guitar) and John Duff Lowe (piano) played for The Quarrymen in the 1950s

John Duff Lowe – vocals, keyboards 
Rod Davis – vocals, acoustic guitar 
Richie Gould – bass 
John Ozoroff – guitar 
Charles Hart – percussion
Graham Waddell – engineer 
Nick Webb – mastering 
Andy Allen – engineer 
Oliver Jones – assistant engineer

References

External links

Open for Engagements, MusicMoz
Open for Engagements, 45worlds

1994 debut albums
Griffin Music albums
The Quarrymen albums
Covers albums